The 1906 Colorado gubernatorial election was held on November 6, 1906. Republican nominee Henry Augustus Buchtel defeated Democratic nominee Alva Adams with 45.59% of the vote.

General election

Candidates
Major party candidates
Henry Augustus Buchtel, Republican
Alva Adams, Democratic

Other candidates
Ben B. Lindsey, Independent
Bill Haywood, Socialist
Frank C. Chamberlain, Prohibition

Results

References

1906
Colorado
Gubernatorial